Egone atrisquamata is a moth of the family Erebidae first described by George Hampson in 1926. It is found in Australia.

References

Calpinae